Leela Sharon Aheer  (born September 26, 1970) is a Canadian politician who was elected in the 2015 Alberta election to the Legislative Assembly of Alberta, and re-elected in the 2019 Alberta general election.

On June 8, 2022, Aheer announced her candidacy in the 2022 United Conservative Party leadership election. She came last in the election.

Early life and career 
Aheer was born in Edmonton, but her family moved to Chestermere in 1979. After graduating from Chestermere High School in 1988, Aheer spent ten months in South India, where her family originated. Aheer began her university education in Political Science at the University of Calgary, but transferred to the University of Manitoba to earn a Bachelor of Music degree. Post-graduation, she taught music for 22 years and was involved in family-owned businesses, including property investment, a car wash, and a gas station.

Political career

Wildrose MLA 
Aheer defeated incumbent Wildrose-turned-PC MLA Bruce McAllister by a slim margin in 2015, becoming the second member to represent Chestermere-Rocky View.

UCP Deputy Leader 
Aheer supported the merger between Wildrose and the PCs based on the desires of her constituents. On October 30, 2017, Aheer was appointed deputy leader of the United Conservative Party by newly elected leader Jason Kenney. She expressed surprise at Kenney's move, describing herself as a "very centrist conservative" who might challenge some of his views.

As deputy leader, she urged delegates at the founding UCP policy convention not to adopt an anti-GSA motion as official party policy. It passed with 57% support.

Minister of Culture, Multiculturalism, and Status of Women 
On April 30, 2019, Leela Aheer was appointed Alberta's Minister of Culture, Multiculturalism, and Status of Women.

As Minister, Aheer introduced Alberta's version of Clare's Law in tandem with Alberta's Minister of Community and Social Services, Rajan Sawhney. The legislation aims to empower those at potential risk of a domestic violence relationship to have access to information about their partner's criminal history and attempts to provide those at risk of domestic violence with fuller awareness of an intimate partner's previous history of domestic violence or violent acts.

On November 19, 2019, Aheer declared the date Women's Entrepreneurship Day in Alberta at the first-ever Canadian-based Women's Entrepreneurship Day summit. The day seeks to break down the barriers faced by female entrepreneurs, and is the first time the day is recognized in Canada. Aheer says the day is an “opportunity to be able to recognize the many ways women contribute to the economy.”

She was removed from her position on July 8, 2021 after criticizing Jason Kenney.

UCP Leadership Campaign 
On June 8, 2022, Aheer announced her candidacy in the 2022 United Conservative Party leadership election at an event in Chestermere. In August, Aheer helped rescue a rodeo participant in Strathmore, Alberta by grabbing a charging bull by its horns keep the bull back. Others had joined Aheer to intervene to stop the charging bull.

In August, Aheer was cleared of violations of the Election Finances and Contributions Disclosure Act. She was originally fined for allegedly exceeding the contribution limit but was cleared by Calgary Court of Queen's Bench which rescinded the finding by the Alberta Elections Commissioner.

After her first-ballot defeat in the leadership race, Aheer announced she would not be running for the United Conservative Party in the next provincial election, saying "I chose to run for the UCP leadership to reflect my commitment and values and give back to the province that has given so much to my family and me, but the members have stated their wishes for leadership and a new direction for our party. I respect their decision.”

Electoral history

2019 general election

2015 general election

References

1970 births
Living people
Politicians from Edmonton
Wildrose Party MLAs
Women MLAs in Alberta
21st-century Canadian politicians
21st-century Canadian women politicians
Canadian politicians of Indian descent
United Conservative Party MLAs
Members of the Executive Council of Alberta
Women government ministers of Canada